Route 666 was a comic book series published by American company CrossGen Entertainment starting from July 2002. Written by Tony Bedard  and drawn by Karl Moline, it was CrossGen's first horror comic venture, and contained a blend of action, menace and humor. It ended at issue #22 in June 2004, as part of CrossGen's bankruptcy.

Setting
Route 666 takes place on the fictional planet of Erebus in a country called The United States of Empyrean, which mimics the innocent feel and the actual mindset, lifestyles and technology of the 1950s era of own Earth's United States of America. A feuding nation, the People's Republic of Rodina, is presumably a combination of Russia and China, creating a mood through the book that mirrors the Cold War between capitalism and communism (Rodina is Russian for "motherland").

Plot summary
The lead character, Cassie Heloise Starkweather, or Cassie, could see dead people when she was a child, but she repressed the talent. As a college student, she finds herself on the run after a pair of dark spirits catches her talking to the soul of her recently deceased roommate and teammate, Helene Mengert, a young Welkin State University gymnast who had been inadvertently killed by a chain of reactions created by Cassie's lack of concentration on a balance beam.

Ridden with guilt and declared unstable by a Doctor Melchior, Cassie is dispatched to a sanitorium, Melchior Asylum, where she learns that half the staff is tied up in this sinister conspiracy. It seems there's a war going on in the next world, and agents of "The Adversary", disguised as mostly B-movie monsters or creatures of the local legends, prowl this world to kidnap the souls of people who've died violently. Cassie flees from the monsters, but they manage to pin the blame for the murders on her, so she's building quite a reputation as a psychotic serial killer.

Cassie has problems getting help. Most people do not want to admit they are sharing a world with soul-stealing monsters, so they refuse to believe anything Cassie says. One person who does believe her is a psychotic serial killer known as the "Railsplitter".

As Cassie flees from local authorities, the National Bureau of Investigation, and her home state of Welkin, she brings misfortune to the small county of Gossmer. Cisco, a local sheriff, recognizes her as the accused murderer reported on the news. Cassie steals his squad car; Cisco wants to give chase in his son's truck, but his son Miguel insists he's the only one who can drive it. While in pursuit, they fall victim to Cassie's ever-increasing bad luck; her car loses control and they all crash. Miguel dies.

Cisco has every reason to blame Cassie for his son's death and to become her greatest enemy. However, he maintains himself through most of the series as her most supportive "compadre".  They almost become their own family, she a surrogate daughter and he a father figure.
 

2002 comics debuts
CrossGen titles
Fantasy comics
Horror comics